Life is the characteristic that distinguishes organisms from inorganic substances and dead objects.

Life or The Life may also refer to:

Human life
 Human life (disambiguation)
 Human condition, the characteristics, events, and situations of human existence
 Biography, a written, filmed, etc. description of a person's life
 Autobiography, an account of one's own life
 Everyday life, what a person does and feels on an everyday basis
 Personal life, an individual's life
 Life imprisonment, a sentence of imprisonment

Arts and media

Films
  Life (1920 film), a lost 1920 American silent drama film
  Life (1928 film), a British silent drama film
 Life (1984 film), a Chinese film
  Life (1996 film), an Australian drama film
  Life (1999 film), an American comedy film
 The Life (2004 film), a Canadian made-for-TV drama film
  Whore (2004 film), a Spanish drama film also called The Life
 Life!, a 2005 Dutch film
 The Life (2012 film), a Ugandan film
 Life (2015 film), an American biopic
  Life (2017 film), an American science fiction horror film

Gaming
 Life (gaming), a play-turn for a player-character
 The Game of Life, a board game
 Conway's Game of Life, a cellular automaton
 Life, development title for the 1983 Atari game, Lifespan

Music

Albums
 Life (Sly and the Family Stone album), 1968
Life (Exuma album), 1973
Life (Thin Lizzy album), 1983
Life (Is So Strange), a 1983 album by War
Life (Neil Young & Crazy Horse album), 1987
Life (Inspiral Carpets album), 1990
Life (The Cardigans album), 1995
Life (Simply Red album), 1995
Life (Talisman album), 1995
 Life (soundtrack), the 1999 soundtrack to the 1999 film
Life (Black Biscuits album), a 1999 album featuring Vivian Hsu
Life, a 1999 album by Nelson
Life (Dope album), 2001
Life (ZOEgirl album), 2001
The Life (album), a 2001 album by Ginuwine
Life, a 2002 album by Z-Ro
Life (Frukwan album), 2003
Life (Yo Gotti album), 2003
Life (Andy Hunter album), 2005
Life (Ricky Martin album), 2005
Life (KRS-One album), 2006
Life (Marcia Hines album), 2007
 Life (David "Fathead" Newman album), 2007
Life (Angela Aki album), 2010
Life (Cueshé album), 2010
Life (Sage Francis album), 2010
L.i.f.e, a 2012 album by Josh Osho
Life (EP), a 2013 release by Heo Young-saeng
L.I.F.E, a 2013 album by Burna Boy
Life (Sigma album), 2015
Life (Adagio album), 2017
Life, a 2018 album by Boy George & Culture Club
Life (Conrad Sewell album), 2019

Songs
 "Life" (Ana Johnsson song), 2004
 "Life" (Des'ree song), 1998
 "Life" (E-Type song), 2001
 "Life" (Elvis Presley song), 1971
 "The Life" (Fifth Harmony song), 2016
 "Life" (Haddaway song), 1993
 "Life" (K-Ci & JoJo song), 1999
 "Life" (Mika Nakashima song), 2007
 "Life" (Our Lady Peace song), 2000
 "Life" (Ricky Nelson song), 1971
 "Life" (Toše Proeski song), 2004
 "Life" (Yui song), 2005
 "Life (Diamonds in the Dark)", 2013 John Dahlbäck song
 "Life (Me no Mae no Mukō e)", 2010 Kanjani8 song
 "The Life", by Alicia Keys from Songs in A Minor
 "Life", by ...And You Will Know Us by the Trail of Dead from So Divided
 "Life", by Atheist from Piece of Time
 "Life", by Audio Adrenaline from Audio Adrenaline
 "Life", by Ayumi Hamasaki from Mirrorcle World
 "Life", by Bleeding Through from Love Will Kill All
 "Life", by Collective Soul from See What You Started by Continuing
 "Life", by Conrad Sewell from Life
 "Life", by Devin Townsend from Ocean Machine: Biomech
 "Life", by E-Type featuring Na Na from Euro IV Ever
 "The Life", by Estelle from All of Me
 "Life", by Flipper from Album – Generic Flipper
 "The Life", by Gary Clark Jr. from Blak and Blu
 "The Life", by Hinder from All American Nightmare
 "The Life", by Mystic from Cuts for Luck and Scars for Freedom
 "Life", by Royce da 5'9" featuring Amerie on Royce da 5'9" from Rock City
 "Life", by Sonata Arctica from The Ninth Hour
 "Life?", by Napalm Death from Scum
 "L.I.F.E.", by Lil Mama from VYP (Voice of the Young People)

Other uses in music
 Life (rapper), British hip hop musician
 Life Records, a Malaysian record label
 Life Records, an imprint of Bellmark Records
 The Life (musical), a 1990 musical

Print media

Fiction
 A Life, the English title of the 1892 novel Una Vita by Italo Svevo
  A Life (play), a 1979 play by Hugh Leonard
 A Life, a 1986 work by Iain Crichton Smith
 Life (manga), a 2002 shōjo manga series
 Life, a 2004 novel by Gwyneth Jones
  The Life (novel), a 2011 novel by Malcolm Knox
 The Life, a 2012 novel by Martina Cole

Non-fiction books
  Life (Sadava book), a 1983 biological science textbook, in its 11th edition as of 2016
 A Life, the 1988 autobiography of Elia Kazan
 Life: A Natural History of the First Four Billion Years of Life on Earth, a 1997 natural history by Richard Fortey
 A Life, a 2001 memoir of Gabriel Josipovici's mother
  Life (Richards book), a 2010 memoir by The Rolling Stones guitarist Keith Richards

Non-fiction periodicals
  Life (magazine), an American magazine from 1883 to 1972 and from 1978 to 2000
  Life (newspapers), local papers from Lerner Newspapers
  Life (journal), a scientific journal published by MDPI
 IUBMB Life, a scientific journal published by the International Union of Biochemistry and Molecular Biology

Radio
 The Life, an Australian radio programme hosted by the comedy duo Roy and HG
 Life 103.1, the slogan for WLHC, an American radio station licensed to Robbins, North Carolina, United States
 Life FM (disambiguation), one of several radio stations
 Life Radio, a Philippine radio network

Television
 Life (American TV series), a 2007–2009 American police drama aired on NBC
 Life (British TV series), a 2009 British nature documentary series aired on the BBC
 Life (2020 TV series), a drama series aired on the BBC
 Life (Japanese TV series), a 2007 Japanese television series, based on the manga series of the same name
 Life (South Korean TV series), a 2018 South Korean television series
 "Life" (Stargate: Universe), an episode of Stargate: Universe
 Life TV (Philippines), a Philippine television channel
 The Life (advertisement), a 2009 television and cinema advertisement for the Halo 3: ODST video game
 The Life Collection, David Attenborough's series of BBC natural history programmes from 1979 to 2005
 GMA Life TV, an international Filipino television station
 9Life, an Australian television channel sometimes called Life
 Life Network, rebranded as Slice in 2007, a former Canadian television specialty network
 Life TV Media, a British broadcasting company

Other arts
 Life (sculpture), a 1968 sculpture in Halifax, Nova Scotia, Canada

Businesses and organizations
 Life (news agency, Russia), Russian news website
 Life Racing Engines, a former racing team
 Life Technologies (Thermo Fisher Scientific), a corporation acquired by Thermo Fisher Scientific in 2014
 Life University, a college in Marietta, Georgia, United States
 lifecell, a Ukraine mobile network operator, formerly called life:)
 Lambda Phi Epsilon, a North American Asian-interest fraternity nicknamed Life
 The LIFE Programme (French : L’Instrument Financier pour l’Environnement), the European Union's funding instrument for the environment and climate action.
 Life Scout (Boy Scouts of America), the second-highest rank attainable in the Boy Scouts of America

Technology
 Laser Inertial Fusion Energy, a laser inertial fusion power plant design
 Lunar Infrastructure for Exploration, a space telescope project
 Living Interplanetary Flight Experiment, Shuttle-LIFE and Phobos-LIFE
 Large Interferometer For Exoplanets

Other uses
 Life (cereal), a cereal distributed by the Quaker Oats Company
 Life, Tennessee, an unincorporated community in the United States
 Living Is For Everyone, a suicide prevention initiative of the Australian government's National Suicide Prevention Strategy
 LIFE Act, a 2000 United States immigration law
 LYF (pronounced life), or Reliance LYF, a 4G smartphone brand owned by Reliance Industries
 Life (gamer), alias of Korean former professional StarCraft II player Lee Seung-Hyun, convicted and banned from competition for match fixing

See also
 Life on Earth (disambiguation)
 Life skills, human abilities to deal effectively with the demands and challenges of life
 Life, the universe and everything (disambiguation)
 My Life (disambiguation)
 Meaning of life
 Phenomenological life, life considered from a philosophical and rigorously phenomenological point of view
 Creature (disambiguation)
 Organism, a living entity
 Real life, a phrase used to distinguish between actual and fictional or idealized worlds
 List of life forms